Pseudolithos migiurtinus is a species of succulent plant in the genus Pseudolithos. Native to Somalia, it is akin to other species in the genus in that it grows in arid environments and is a small, leafless plant that looks somewhat like a stone, hence the name (Pseudolithos meaning "false stone"). It can range from green to ochre in color.

References

migiurtinus
Flora of Somalia
Plants described in 1975